Syria (SYR) competed at the 1998 Asian Games in Bangkok, Thailand. The total medal tally was 6.

Medals

Silver
 Wrestling
Men's freestyle 69 kg: Ahmad al-Osta

Bronze
 Swimming
Men's 1500 m freestyle: Hisham Al-Masri

See also
 Syria at the 2002 Asian Games

Nations at the 1998 Asian Games
1998
Asian Games